The inferior cardiac nerve arises from either the inferior cervical or the first thoracic ganglion. 

It descends behind the subclavian artery and along the front of the trachea, to join the deep part of the cardiac plexus. 

It communicates freely behind the subclavian artery with the recurrent nerve and the middle cardiac nerve.

See also
 inferior cervical ganglion
 vagus nerve

External links

Sympathetic nervous system